Michel Windal (born 1 January 1948) is a French former field hockey player. He competed in the men's tournament at the 1968 Summer Olympics.

References

External links
 

1948 births
Living people
French male field hockey players
Olympic field hockey players of France
Field hockey players at the 1968 Summer Olympics
People from Sucy-en-Brie
Sportspeople from Val-de-Marne